Reine Philiberte Rouph de Varicourt (1757–1822) was a French lady of letters. The sister of Pierre-Marin Rouph de Varicourt, she was spotted by Voltaire during his stay at Ferney – he made her his adoptive daughter, married her off to the Marquis de Villette (though the marriage proved unhappy, ending in her adoption by Voltaire's companion Marie Louise Mignot) and gained her entry to the literary world under the pseudonym "Belle et Bonne".

Notes

1757 births
1822 deaths
Voltaire
French women novelists
French novelists
18th-century French women writers
18th-century French writers
19th-century French women writers